Campos Novos Paulista is a municipality in the state of São Paulo in Brazil. Its original given name in 1880 was Campos Novos do Paranapanema, being later simplified to Campos Novos, and finally acquiring its current name around 1940. The region was originally inhabited by the Caingangues people, being later colonized by immigrants and having its lands dedicated to the production of coffee.

References

External links
 Campos Novos Paulista municipality webpage in Brazilian Portuguese

Municipalities in São Paulo (state)